Uru, also known as Fat Boat in English, is a type of dhow made in Beypore, Kerala, in the southwestern coast of India. 

This type of boat has been used by the Arabs since ancient times as trading vessels, and even now, urus are being manufactured and exported to Arab nations from Beypore. These boats used to be built of several types of wood, the main one being teak. The teak was taken from Nilambur forests in earlier times, but now imported Malaysian teak is used. A couple of boat-building yards can still be found near the Beypore port.

History
The art of Uru making in Beypore, on the northern coast of Kerala, is as old as the beginnings of India’s maritime trade with Mesopotamia. Islands dotting the Chaliyar river have continued the tradition for over a millennium.

Construction
As an art passed down through generations, Uru-making is an undocumented practice. There are no build plans, sketches, drawings, or blueprints that the makers refer to. From conception to completion, it is all in the mind of the master carpenter or maistry of a yard, who assigns work to his assistants on a daily basis, so as to keep the secrecy that shrouds the technology intact.

See also
Pattamar
Kattumaram

References

External links

The Origins and Ethnological Significance of Indian Boat Designs
Pattamar
Vele dell’Oceano Indiano e dell’Indonesia
Old Photos of Bombay

Boat types
History of Kerala
Dhow types
Economy of Kerala
Tall ships